Wang Aichen (born 28 March 1985 in Liaoning) is a male Chinese windsurfer. He competed for Team China at the 2008 Summer Olympics (finishing in 7th) and 2012 Summer Olympics in the men's RS-X class (finishing in 18th place).

Major performances
 1999 National Junior Boardsailing Championships - 1st windsurfing;
 2003/2004 National Championships - 1st Funboard/Mistral;
 2006 ISAF Word Sailing Games - 11th NP class;
 2007 National Champions Tournament - 2nd NP class

References

 http://2008teamchina.olympic.cn/index.php/personview/personsen/4260

External links
 
 
 

1985 births
Living people
Chinese windsurfers
Chinese male sailors (sport)
Olympic sailors of China
Sailors at the 2008 Summer Olympics – RS:X
Sailors at the 2012 Summer Olympics – RS:X
Sailors at the 2016 Summer Olympics – RS:X
Asian Games gold medalists for China
Asian Games medalists in sailing
Sailors at the 2010 Asian Games
Sailors at the 2014 Asian Games
Medalists at the 2010 Asian Games
Medalists at the 2014 Asian Games
Sportspeople from Liaoning
21st-century Chinese people